Falconer School is a secondary school catering to students with special needs (primarily learning disabilities or those diagnosed with social, emotional and mental health - SEMH difficulties). Falconer is situated in Hertfordshire and provides day education for pupils that attend. The school was founded in 1974, in Bushey, Hertfordshire.

Education
Falconer provides students with a range of qualifications up to GCSE-level, through a mix of both academic and vocational work. Each student has a personal say on the qualification subjects that they participate in. As of present, Falconer school offers a total of 25 qualifications which are available to students:
 English Literature
 English Language
 English (mixed)
 Mathematics (both foundation and higher)
 Science (only 'single' science is currently available at Falconer School, while changes are being made to ensure that they are able to provide students with further qualifications in science if the student needs require so)
 Art
 Music (Arts Award & Full GCSE)
 Design & Technology (Resistant Materials)
 ICT 
 History 
 Physical Education Foundation Qualification
 Religious Education 
 Horticulture Qualification
 Construction Qualification

(Details needed on exact detailing of courses)

Boarding
Residential facilities are no longer available.

External links
 Falconer School's website
 Falconer School's VLE

Special secondary schools in England
Special schools in Hertfordshire
Community schools in Hertfordshire